Christine Neubauer (born 24 June 1962 in Munich) is a German actress and author.

Life and work

Background and education 
 
Christine Neubauer is the daughter of a printer. Her ancestors came from Munich, Lower Bavaria and Swabia. She attended Mary Ward Secondary School in Nymphenburg and graduated in 1978 with an intermediate certificate. She studied psychology for two semesters and then took acting lessons. She attended the Lee Strasberg Theatre and Film Institute in New York. In the early 1980s she was engaged at the Munich Volkstheater and the Theater der Jugend.

Film and television 
After her television debut as the mother of a missing baby in the series The Andro-Jäger (1984) Neubauer made her film debut in the film . After she had been involved in other television films in small roles, she earned wide recognition in 1987 in the television series Löwengrube.

In 1992 she won an award for her portrayal of Traudl Grandauer.

On 14 April 2008, she explored her family history in an episode of Das Geheimnis meiner Familie, the German adaptation of the UK TV series Who Do You Think You Are?.

Besides her work as an actress Neubauer made a name as an author of books.

Private life 
Neubauer married her childhood sweetheart Lambert Dinzinger, a sports journalist and presenter at the Bayerischer Rundfunk. They have a son (born 1992), who played a supporting role in Neubauer's film Eva Zacharias in 2004. Even after announcing their separation in January 2011 the couple lived together in Pullach. In November 2011, Neubauer filed for divorce, 
which took place in November, 2014. Since mid-2012, she is in a relationship with the Chilean photographer José Campos.

Social engagement 
Since 2007, Christine Neubauer committed to the children's charity Save the Children. In addition, she was appointed in October 2007 to the Ambassador of the German Red Cross. She is also a mentor of LILALU and committed to Plan International.

Filmography

Works 
 Das Vollweib-Kochbuch: Schlemmen ohne Reue – Meine Lieblingsrezepte. Knaur, München 2004, .
 Die Vollweib-Diät. Mein Weg zur Wohlfühl-Figur. Knaur, München 2004, .
 Das Vollweib-Training: Meine Workouts für eine Wohlfühl-Figur. Knaur, München 2005, .
 Vollweib pur! Mein 4-Wochen-Programm. Knaur-Ratgeber-Verlag, München 2006, .
 Vollweib-Beauty: Mein Weg zu einer attraktiven Ausstrahlung. Knaur-Taschenbuch-Verlag, München 2006, .
 Die Memoiren der Fanny Hill. (Hörbuch mit John Cleland). Oskar Verlag, München 2006, .
 Das Leben ist jo-jo: Meine Wohlfühlgeheimnisse. Rütten & Loening, Berlin 2012, .
 Weight Watchers. Mein Genießerkochbuch Büchlein – Christine Neubauer Freundschaftsedition. Weight Watchers, 2012.

Awards 

 1992: Adolf-Grimme-Preis in Gold for Löwengrube
 1996: Telestar "Best actress in a tv series" for Solange es die Liebe gibt
 1999: Adolf-Grimme-Preis for Krambambuli
 2000: Bavari Awards for Frische Ware
 2002: Pro meritis scientiae et litterarum
 2002: Bayerischer Poetentaler
 2006: Golden Romy award for most popular actress
 2007: Bavarian Order of Merit
 2008: Romy TV award for most popular actress
 2008: Bambi Award in the category "TV"
 2012: Monte-Carlo Television Festival Golden Nymph for her role in Hannas Entscheidung

References

External links 
 
 Christine Neubauer bei filmportal.de
 
 Offizielle Website von Christine Neubauer

1962 births
Actresses from Munich
German actresses
Living people